Christopher L. Clark Deschene is an American politician, attorney, and energy development expert. A member of the Navajo Nation, Deschene was the Democratic Party's candidate for Secretary of State in Arizona in 2010, and served as a Department of Energy official in the Barack Obama Administration.

Biography
Deschene was born in California, but moved with his parents, a homemaker from Dennehotso, Arizona and a welder from Tuba City, Arizona. Deschene spent his youth in LeChee, Arizona and attended high school in Page, Arizona. After graduating from high school in 1989, Deschene attended the United States Naval Academy, graduating in 1993 with a Bachelor of Science in Mechanical Engineering and a commission as a Second Lieutenant in the United States Marine Corps. He was deployed on several missions overseas, including the Persian Gulf and Southeast Asia. After completing two tours of active duty, Deschene continued on as a reservist for a total of 10 years of military service.

After leaving the Marines, Deschene earned a Juris Doctor from the Sandra Day O'Connor College of Law, and a Master's of Science degree in Engineering from the Ira A. Fulton Schools of Engineering.

His grandfather was a Navajo code talker during World War II.

Career
He subsequently co-founded Law Office of Schaff & Clark Deschene, specializing in questions of energy infrastructure. Deschene worked at this firm for a decade before joining the Obama Administration in 2015.

Deschene served as a member of the Arizona House of Representatives from 2009 to 2011, representing District 2. He was member of both the Committee for Natural Resources and Rural Affairs and the Committee for Water and Energy. Prior to his election to the legislature, he was the chair of the Apache County Democratic Party from 2007 to 2008 and the chair of the Native American Democratic Caucus.

In 2010, he won the Democratic Party's nomination for Secretary of State, beating Sam Wercinski with 62.7% vs. 37.3% of the votes. He lost the general election to Ken Bennett.

In the Navajo Nation presidential election, 2015 he ran for president of the Navajo Nation, though he was later disqualified by the Navajo Nation Office of Hearings and Appeals for failing to show fluency in the Navajo language.

In 2015, Deschene joined the United States Department of Energy as the Director for the Office of Indian Energy Policy and Programs, serving under Secretary Ernest Moniz. He served in the role through the end of the administration and aided in the transition effort.

In June 2017, he joined Rosette, LLP as a partner in their Washington, D.C. office, where he practices energy law.

References

Living people
Democratic Party members of the Arizona House of Representatives
Navajo Nation politicians
Navajo people
United States Naval Academy alumni
United States Marine Corps officers
People from Tuba City, Arizona
1970 births
20th-century Native Americans
21st-century Native Americans